Paul-André Colombani (born 17 August 1967) is a French politician representing Pè a Corsica. He was elected to the French National Assembly on 18 June 2017, representing the 2nd constituency of the department of Corse-du-Sud.

See also

 2017 French legislative election

References

1967 births
Living people
People from Bastia
Deputies of the 15th National Assembly of the French Fifth Republic
Deputies of the 16th National Assembly of the French Fifth Republic
Pè a Corsica politicians
Party of the Corsican Nation politicians
21st-century French politicians
Corsican nationalists